Baeomorpha  is an extinct genus of rotoitid parasitic wasp, known from the Late Cretaceous (~99-72 ma) of Laurasia. The type species, B. dubitata was named by Charles Thomas Brues for a specimen found in 72 million year old Canadian Amber. The vast majority of species are known from the Russian Taimyr amber, of upper Santonian age but two species (including type) are known from the upper Campanian Canadian amber, while one species is known from the lower Cenomanian Burmese amber.

Taxonomy 
In the initial 1937 description, Brues placed the genus within the Scelionidae. Yoshimoto [de] in 1975 placed it within Tetracampidae In 2017 during a comprehensive review of the genus, it was placed in Rotoitidae, an otherwise relict group only known from two extant genera in New Zealand and Chile. The study also placed two species described by Yoshimoto, B. distincta and B. elongata as synonyms of B. ovatata. In 2019 a new species B. liorum was described from the Burmese amber, significantly increasing the latitudinal and stratigraphic range of the taxon.

Baeomorpha avamica Gumovsky, 2017 Taimyr amber
Baeomorpha baikurensis Gumovsky, 2017 Taimyr amber
Baeomorpha bianellus Gumovsky, 2017 Taimyr amber
Baeomorpha caeleps Gumovsky, 2017 Taimyr amber
Baeomorpha dubitata Brues, 1937 Canadian amber
Baeomorpha gracilis Gumovsky, 2017 Taimyr amber
Baeomorpha ingens Gumovsky, 2017 Taimyr amber
Baeomorpha liorum Huber, Shih & Ren, 2019 Burmese amber
Baeomorpha ovatata Yoshimoto, 1975 Canadian amber,
Baeomorpha popovi Gumovsky, 2017 Taimyr amber
Baeomorpha quattorduo Gumovsky, 2017 Taimyr amber
Baeomorpha quattoruno Gumovsky, 2017 Taimyr amber
Baeomorpha yantardakh Gumovsky, 2017 Taimyr amber
Baeomorpha zherikhini Gumovsky, 2017 Taimyr amber

References 

Chalcidoidea
Burmese amber